Raymond "Ray" Handscombe (birth registered first ¼ 1950) is an English former professional rugby league footballer who played in the 1970s and 1980s.

Playing career

Handscombe made his début for Wakefield Trinity during September 1974, he played his last match for Wakefield Trinity during the 1978–79 season, he made his début for Featherstone Rovers on Sunday 29 October 1978, during his time at Featherstone Rovers he scored twenty-nine 3-point tries, and one 4-point try, and he played his last match for Featherstone Rovers during the 1984–85 season.

Challenge Cup Final appearances
Handscombe played  in Featherstone Rovers' 14-12 victory over Hull F.C. in the 1983 Challenge Cup Final during the 1982–83 season at Wembley Stadium, London on Saturday 7 May 1983, in front of a crowd of 84,969.

County Cup Final appearances
Handscombe played  in Wakefield Trinity's 13-16 defeat by Hull Kingston Rovers in the 1974 Yorkshire County Cup Final during the 1974–75 season at Headingley Rugby Stadium, Leeds on Saturday 26 October 1974.

References

External links
Statistics at rugbyleagueproject.org
Ray Handscombe
2012
Willis Fawley
April 2013
Raymond Handscombe
The Story of Wembley 1983. Part I - a featherstone rovers blog
The Story of Wembley 1983. Part II - a featherstone rovers blog
The Story of Wembley 1983. Part III - a featherstone rovers blog
The Story of Wembley 1983. Part IV - a featherstone rovers blog
The Story of Wembley 1983. Part V - a featherstone rovers blog
The Story of Wembley 1983. Part VI - a featherstone rovers blog
The Story of Wembley 1983. Part VII - a featherstone rovers blog
The Story of Wembley 1983. Part VIII - a featherstone rovers blog
The Story of Wembley 1983. Part IX - a featherstone rovers blog
The Story of Wembley 1983. Part X - a featherstone rovers blog
Search for "Raymond Handscombe" at britishnewspaperarchive.co.uk
Search for "Ray Handscombe" at britishnewspaperarchive.co.uk

1950 births
Living people
English rugby league players
Featherstone Rovers players
Leeds Rhinos players
Rugby league hookers
Rugby league players from Wakefield
Wakefield Trinity players